Tomasz Suwary (born 15 August 1974 in Gorzów Wielkopolski) is a former professional Polish footballer.

Suwary made a total of 61 appearances in the Ekstraklasa for Amica Wronki during his playing career.

External links 
 
 

1974 births
Living people
Sportspeople from Gorzów Wielkopolski
Polish footballers
Association football forwards
Ekstraklasa players
Stilon Gorzów Wielkopolski players
Amica Wronki players
Śląsk Wrocław players
FC Sachsen Leipzig players
Lech Poznań players
Tennis Borussia Berlin players
Berliner FC Dynamo players
Polish expatriate footballers
Expatriate footballers in Germany
Expatriate footballers in Greece
VSG Altglienicke players